Mestervik or Meistervik is a village in Balsfjord Municipality in Troms og Finnmark county, Norway. Mestervik Chapel is located here.

References

Villages in Troms
Balsfjord
Populated places of Arctic Norway